The 1930 Colorado Agricultural Aggies football team represented Colorado Agricultural College (now known as Colorado State University) in the Rocky Mountain Conference (RMC) during the 1930 college football season.  In their 21st season under head coach Harry W. Hughes, the Aggies compiled a 3–5–1 record (3–3–1 against conference opponents), finished fifth in the RMC, and were outscored by a total of 104 to 67.

Schedule

References

Colorado Agricultural
Colorado State Rams football seasons
Colorado Agricultural Aggies football